Strassenia is a genus of thrips in the family Phlaeothripidae.

Species
 Strassenia acarus
 Strassenia longisetis

References

Phlaeothripidae
Thrips
Thrips genera